Serbia

 
 

 
 

The Serbia men's national handball team represents Serbia in international handball competitions. It is governed by the Serbian Handball Federation.

Olympic Committee of FR Yugoslavia declared men's national handball team as the best male team of the year in 1999.

History

2012 European Championship
The 2012 European Men's Handball Championship was the tenth edition of the tournament and was held in Serbia from 15–29 January 2012 in the cities of Belgrade, Niš, Novi Sad and Vršac.

Playing in front of their home crowd, the hosts were pitted in Group A against Denmark, Poland and Slovakia. They finished first in the group following victories against Denmark and Poland.

In the main round the team faced Germany, Sweden and Macedonia. Serbia advanced again by defeating two of their three opponents and defeated Croatia in the semifinal 26–22. They faced Denmark in the final, after having already beaten them in the group stage. However, Denmark exacted upon revenge to emerge as champions.

Honours

Competitive record
The Serbian Handball Federation is deemed the direct successor to Yugoslavia and Serbia and Montenegro by EHF.

 Champions   Runners-up   Third place   Fourth place

Olympic Games

World Championship

European Championship

* Colored background indicates that medal was won on the tournament.
** Red border color indicates that tournament was held on home soil.

Mediterranean Games
 1993 – Suspended
 1997 – 5th
 2001 – 5th
 2005 – 4th
 2009 –  Champions
 2013 – 6th
 2018 – 8th
 2022 –  3rd

Team

Current squad
Squad for the 2023 World Men's Handball Championship.

Head coach: Toni Gerona

Individual records 
Bold denotes players still playing international handball.

Most capped players

Top scorers

References

External links

IHF profile

Handball
Men's national handball teams
Handball in Serbia
Men's sport in Serbia